Sudama is the ward number ten of the Balara municipality in Sarlahi District in the province two of south-eastern Nepal. At the time of the most recent census, it has a population of 3,634 people, of which 99.6% are Hindus and 0.4% are Muslims.

The double-decker bridge over the river Manusmara attracts many tourists.

References

External links
UN map of the municipalities of Sarlahi  District

Populated places in Sarlahi District